The Great Northern Railway of Ireland (GNRI) AEC Class were Associated Equipment Company (AEC)–engined diesel multiple units (normally termed railcars in Ireland) that operated InterCity and suburban services on the GNRI and later Ulster Transport Authority (UTA)  systems between 1950 and 1975. They were finally withdrawn in 1972. They were the inspiration for the CIÉ 2600 Class.

History
After 1945 the GNR(I) found itself in a poor financial position as a result of the deprivations of World War II and increased competition from road traffic. It looked to diesel power as a way to streamline costs and bring them back into profitability. Along with diesel locomotives, railcars offered a cheaper and more flexible means of traction than steam-hauled coaches. As a result, in June 1950 the GNR(I) introduced the first of 20 diesel-mechanical railcars (numbers 600–619) ordered from AEC Ltd. of Southall.

Design
These cars, based on a 1930s AEC/Great Western Railway design, were powered by two AEC underfloor engines of 125 hp, each one driving the inner axle of one bogie through a five-speed, pre-selective epicyclic gearbox.

The bodywork was built by Park Royal Vehicles, which like AEC was part of the ACV Group. The design incorporated a full width cab at the front and a guard's and luggage compartment at the rear, as well as a steam-generating unit. Passenger accommodation was in two saloons, a 12-seater first-class saloon, located immediately behind the driving cab, giving passengers a clear view to the line ahead, and 32 seater third-class saloon.

The power cars could operate with either one or two unpowered intermediate coaches. These coaches were built by the GNR(I) at its Dundalk Works.

The GNR(I) railcars were painted in cream and dark blue.

Service
Although limited to four coaches, the AEC's were put in service on the Dublin – Belfast Enterprise service. As a result, these units had the distinction of being the first successful main line diesel railcars in either Ireland or Britain.

Upon dissolution of the GNR in 1958, 10 AEC's went to CIÉ (Where they joined the existing fleet of AEC railcars, with each vehicle number receiving an 'n' suffix), and 10 went to the UTA. The UTA had experimented with AEC railcars in 1951 as well, turning out two power cars, No.'s 6 and 7. The former GNR's AEC's (Now renumbered 111 -120) were technically compatible with 6 and 7.

All 20 were scrapped during the 1970s- CIÉ's inherited 10 were not suitable for conversion to push-pull like their original 60, and were cut up in Mullingar in 1975. The UTA's inherited 10 were subsequently inherited by NIR in 1968 and withdrawn by their new owners in 1972.

CIÉ's AEC Railcars

At the same time as the GNR order, CIÉ ordered 60 (numbers 2600-2659) almost identical versions of the AEC Class as part of its dieselisation programme. These were delivered and put in service between 1951 and 1954. They had improved acceleration over steam traction, with a 15–25 minutes reduction on the Dublin-Waterford running time. They were painted in dark green with pale green lining at the waist. The CIÉ versions were put on mainline duty and on Cork and suburban lines, as well as the Waterford and Tramore line (2657–59). They were also introduced on the West Cork network to replace the existing steam hauled services. Some of CIÉ AECs were converted to push-pull driving car in 1973–74 for use on Dublin suburban services, propelled by rebuilt CIE 201 Class diesel locomotives. They became redundant with the introduction of the electrification of the service by the introduction of the Dublin Area Rapid Transit and so were phased out in 1987. The sole preserved example of the 60 CIÉ cars (Or any Irish AEC railcar, for that matter) is No. 2624 (renumbered as Push-Pull/DVT 6111), based at the Downpatrick and County Down Railway since 7 February 2015.

CIÉ's initial order of 60 AEC's was bolstered in 1956 by six Bullied-designed cars, and again in 1958 when they received 10 cars from the GNR's original order.

Model
An 00 gauge model of a Park Royal AEC railcar is available as an etched-brass kit from Worsley Works.

A Ready to Run OO gauge model is available from Silver Fox Models.  It is available as the NIR and the Irish Railways version in various liveries.

Notes

Sources and further reading

AEC
Railcars of Northern Ireland
Scrapped locomotives